The CONCACAF Gold Cup is North America's major tournament in senior men's football and determines the continental champion. Until 1989, the tournament was known as CONCACAF Championship. It is currently held every two years. From 1996 to 2005, nations from other confederations have regularly joined the tournament as invitees. In earlier editions, the continental championship was held in different countries, but since the inception of the Gold Cup in 1991, the United States are constant hosts or co-hosts.

From 1973 to 1989, the tournament doubled as the confederation's World Cup qualification. CONCACAF's representative team at the FIFA Confederations Cup was decided by a play-off between the winners of the last two tournament editions in 2015 via the CONCACAF Cup, but was then discontinued along with the Confederations Cup.

Since the inaugural tournament in 1963, the Gold Cup was held 26 times and has been won by seven different nations, most often by Mexico (11 titles).

Guadeloupe did not participate in the Championships before 1991. As CONCACAF members but not FIFA members, they have since played in the Caribbean Cup and CONCACAF Nations League which doubled as Gold Cup qualifiers. In fourteen attempts, Guadeloupe qualified three times, back-to-back in 2007, 2009 and 2011. They surprisingly reached the knockout stage on two of those occasions.

Because they are not FIFA members, Guadeloupe were not able to represent CONCACAF at a FIFA Confederations Cup, even if they had won the tournament. Their non-affiliation also enabled them to recruit former French international Jocelyn Angloma for their squad in 2007.

CONCACAF Gold Cup records

Match Overview

Record Players

Top goalscorers

References

Countries at the CONCACAF Gold Cup
Guadeloupe national football team